Obert Daniell Nortjé (born 17 April 1997) is a Namibian rugby union player for the n national team and for the  in the Currie Cup and the Rugby Challenge. His regular position is hooker.

Rugby career

Nortjé was born in Windhoek.

References

1997 births
Living people
Namibia international rugby union players
Namibian rugby union players
Peñarol Rugby players
Rugby union hookers
Rugby union players from Windhoek
Seattle Seawolves players
Welwitschias players
Tel Aviv Heat players
Expatriate rugby union players in Israel
Namibian expatriate rugby union players
Namibian expatriate sportspeople in Israel